Ryan McDonald (born September 21, 1985) is a former American football center. He has also played for the San Diego Chargers of the National Football League. He was signed by the Chargers as an undrafted free agent in 2009.

External links
Ryan McDonald profile at CBS Sports
"McDonald signs with Chargers’ practice squad". Holland Sentinel (September 7, 2009).
San Diego Chargers bio

1985 births
Living people
American football centers
People from Holland, Michigan
Players of American football from Michigan
University of Illinois alumni
San Diego Chargers players
Tampa Bay Storm players